Steve Roud (born 1949) is the creator of the Roud Folk Song Index and an expert on folklore and superstition. He was formerly Local Studies Librarian for the London Borough of Croydon and Honorary Librarian of the Folklore Society.

Life and career

Roud Folk Song Index

The Roud Folk Song Index is a database of over 240,000 references to nearly 25,000 songs collected from oral tradition in the English language from all over the world. It began in around 1970 as a personal project, listing the source singer (if known), their locality, the date of noting the song, the publisher (book or recorded source), plus other fields, and crucially assigning a number to each song, including all variants (now known as the 'Roud number'). The system initially used 3x5-inch filing cards in shoeboxes. In 1993, Roud implemented his record system on a computer database, which he continues to expand and maintain and which is now hosted on the website of the Vaughan Williams Memorial Library.

In the past few years the numbers have been widely accepted in academic circles.

Writings 
Since 2000, Roud has written a range of volumes on folklore, calendar customs and folk music. A number of these have met with substantial acclaim; 2003's The Penguin Guide to the Superstitions of Britain and Ireland was awarded the Folklore Society's prestigious Katharine Briggs Award for the outstanding folklore-related book of the year. 2006's The English Year, which summarises the calendar customs of the British ritual year, was hailed by The Independent as "a rich and wonderful compendium." The Lore of the Playground, Roud's 2010 exploration of the way children's games evolve and transmit through an oral tradition, was praised in publications including The Spectator and The Yorkshire Post, with The Sunday Times describing it as "a delightful compendium".

Roud's later works on folk music, which build upon the deep research embodied in the Roud Index, have also met with strong reviews. The Daily Telegraph called 2012's The New Penguin Book of English Folk Songs (co-edited with music specialist Julia Bishop) "(a)n impressive and nourishing book, with an appeal far beyond the folk aficionado", with similar praise coming from The Times, Record Collector and The Independent. Writing in The Guardian, Kathryn Hughes described Folksong in England (2017) as a "monumental history of the English folk song".

Awards
In 2004, Roud was the winner of the Folklore Society's Katharine Briggs Folklore Award for The Penguin Guide to the Superstitions of Britain and Ireland.

In 2009, Roud was one of five people to be awarded the Gold Badge of the English Folk Dance and Song Society. This award recognises "those who have made unique or outstanding contributions to the art or science of folk dance, music or song, and/or those who have given exceptional support in furthering the aims of the Society".

In 2014, Roud was given the Walford Award by the Chartered Institute of Library and Information Professionals' Information Services Group. His 2012 book with Julia Bishop, The New Penguin Book of English Folk Songs, had won the Reference Award the previous year.

Personal life
Roud resides and works with his wife in Somersham, Cambridgeshire, England.

Books
 (with Jacqueline Simpson) 
 (with Eddie Cass) 
 
 
 
 
 
 
 (with Julia Bishop) 
 (with David Atkinson) 
 
 (with David Atkinson)

References

1949 births
Living people
English folklorists
English folk-song collectors
English librarians